Francisco Jesús Pérez Malia (born 17 December 1981), commonly known as Francis, is a Spanish former footballer who played mainly as a right back, and is a manager.

During his 17-year professional career he played mainly with Xerez and Racing de Santander, appearing in 222 competitive games with the former. He amassed Segunda División totals of 219 matches and one goal over nine seasons, and competed in La Liga with both clubs.

Club career
Born in Barbate, Province of Cádiz, Francis began his senior career with local Xerez CD. After two consecutive loans with third division clubs, including Getafe CF, he returned to his alma mater and made his professional debut in 2003–04's second level, scoring once in 26 games. He went on to become an important first-team member, with the Andalusians achieving a first-ever La Liga promotion in the 2008–09 season.

Francis spent most of the short-lived top flight campaign as a right back. On 8 May 2010, as Xerez still harboured chances of staying up, he netted his only goal of the season, in a 3–2 home win against Real Zaragoza; late into that month, his contract expired and he signed with Racing de Santander for four years.

References

External links

1981 births
Living people
People from Barbate
Sportspeople from the Province of Cádiz
Spanish footballers
Footballers from Andalusia
Association football defenders
Association football midfielders
La Liga players
Segunda División players
Segunda División B players
Xerez CD footballers
Getafe CF footballers
CD San Fernando players
Écija Balompié players
Racing de Santander players
Spanish football managers
Segunda Federación managers